The Berkeley Building (also known as the Old John Hancock Building) is a 26-story,   building located at 200 Berkeley Street, Boston, Massachusetts, USA.  It is the second of the three John Hancock buildings built in Boston; it was succeeded by the John Hancock Tower. The building is known for the weather beacon at its summit, which displays distinctive light patterns as weather forecasts. The Berkeley Building is the 20th-tallest building in the city.

History

The building, located in Boston's Back Bay, was designed by Cram and Ferguson and completed in 1947. From 1947 until 1964 it was the second-tallest building in the city, one foot (30 cm) shorter than the  Custom House Tower, but a much larger building and a conspicuous landmark. The Prudential Tower, completed in 1964, dwarfed both. , 17 buildings are taller, yet it remains an easily recognized Boston landmark, familiar to commuters crossing the Charles River. A drawing of this building served as a logo for the John Hancock Insurance company for many years.

In March 2003, the John Hancock Insurance company sold the Berkeley Building, along with the Stephen L. Brown building and the John Hancock Tower, to Beacon Capital Partners.  In December 2006, the Berkeley and Brown buildings were reacquired by John Hancock.  the John Hancock company refers to it as "The Berkeley Building," but in common parlance it is "the Old John Hancock Building."

Design and features

Observation Floor
In addition to regular offices, the top 26th floor also accommodated two observation areas looking out over the Boston skyline.  Access was free to the public and a Reception and Information Desk was staffed during normal business hours.

Back Bay Events Center
It is also the home of the Back Bay Events Center: this two-part structure is the John Hancock Hall proper and the Dorothy Quincy Suite (a single room, capacity of approximately 900.) The Hall also contains a full box office and an 1100-seat auditorium. This is the annual site of the Massachusetts High School Drama Guild One-Act Festival's State Finals.

Weather beacon
It is topped by a weather beacon with red and blue lights, which use a code to present the local weather forecast, using a popular rhyme as a mnemonic:

Steady blue, clear view.
Flashing blue, clouds due.
Steady red, rain ahead.
Flashing red, snow instead.

During baseball season, flashing red means the Boston Red Sox game has been called off on account of weather.

The beacon was first lit on March 15, 1950 and was controlled using forecasts from a meteorological agency located on the 26th floor.  It was kept lit until 1973 when it was shut off to set an example during an energy crisis which also temporarily shut off the famed Citgo sign in Kenmore Square.  The beacon was re-lit in 1983 and has continued to display the weather forecast ever since.

In October 2004, the beacon flashed red and blue to commemorate the World Series victory of the Boston Red Sox. This was the first time the color scheme changed since the beacon was lit in 1950. A new line was added to the poem accordingly:

Flashing Blue and Red, The Curse of the Bambino is dead!

The beacon again flashed red and blue when the Red Sox won the 2007 World Series, as well as when they won the 2013 World Series. However, it did not flash red and blue the night they clinched the 2018 World Series.

Gallery

See also

 List of tallest buildings in Boston
 HDB/Cram and Ferguson

References

External links

 Homepage

Skyscraper office buildings in Boston
Back Bay, Boston
Office buildings completed in 1947
Ralph Adams Cram buildings
1940s architecture in the United States
Art Deco architecture in Massachusetts
1947 establishments in Massachusetts